Waynesburg Historic District is a national historic district located at Waynesburg, Greene County, Pennsylvania.  The district includes 183 contributing buildings in the central business district and surrounding residential areas of Waynesburg. The buildings include notable examples of High Victorian Italianate, Second Empire, Queen Anne, and Georgian Revival style architecture. Notable non-residential buildings include 10 buildings associated with Waynesburg University, 7 churches, the Greene County Courthouse, Greene County Jail, and Waynesboro Borough Building.  Among the buildings at Waynesburg University are the separately listed Hanna Hall and Miller Hall.

It was added to the National Register of Historic Places in 1984.

References

Historic districts on the National Register of Historic Places in Pennsylvania
Italianate architecture in Pennsylvania
Queen Anne architecture in Pennsylvania
Georgian Revival architecture in Pennsylvania
Buildings and structures in Greene County, Pennsylvania
National Register of Historic Places in Greene County, Pennsylvania